Nebularia acuminata (common name: acuminate mitre) is a species of sea snail, a marine gastropod mollusc in the family Mitridae, the miters or miter snails.

Description
The shell size varies between 17 mm and 35 mm.

Distribution
This species is distributed in the Indian Ocean (along Aldabra, the Mascarene Basin, Mauritius and Tanzania) and in the Pacific Ocean (along Indonesia, Papua New Guinea, Solomons, Fiji and Australia).

References

 Spry, J.F. (1961). The sea shells of Dar es Salaam: Gastropods. Tanganyika Notes and Records 56
 Cernohorsky W. O. (1976). The Mitrinae of the World. Indo-Pacific Mollusca 3(17) page(s): 492
 Drivas, J. & M. Jay (1988). Coquillages de La Réunion et de l'île Maurice

acuminata
Gastropods described in 1824